The 2015–16 Copa del Rey de Balonmano was the 41st edition of this tournament, organized by Liga ASOBAL. The tournament began on October 3 and 4, 2015, with the matches of the first round.

FC Barcelona Lassa won its 17th Copa del Rey title after defeating host team Helvetia Anaitasuna in the Final 33–30.

Competition format and calendar

First round
Matches were played on 1, 3 and 4 October 2015.

All times are CEST.

|}

Matches

Second round
The second round was drawn with the first one. Matches were played on 27 and 28 October 2015.

All times are CET.

|}

Matches

Round of 16
The draw took place on 29 October 2015 at RFEBM's headquarters.

Matches were played on 15 and 16 December.

|}

Matches

Quarter-finals
The draw took place on 19 December 2015 at Palacio de los Deportes de León's press room.

The matches were played on 9 March (1st leg) and 12 March (2nd leg).

|}

Matches

First leg

Second leg

Final four
The Final Four was played on 7/8 May at Pabellón Anaitasuna in Pamplona, Navarre. The draw was conducted on 18 April. Helvetia Anaitasuna's win over Naturhouse La Rioja in semifinals qualified it for 2016–17 EHF Cup as FC Barcelona, Naturhouse La Rioja and ABANCA Ademar León are already qualified for European competitions via Liga ASOBAL.

Semifinals

Final

See also
Liga ASOBAL 2015–16
División de Plata de Balonmano 2015–16

References

External links
Copa del Rey at ASOBAL.es
Copa del Rey at RFEBM.net

2015-16
2015–16 in Spanish handball